Sattar Oraki, (born 5 May 1969  in Ahvaz) is an Iranian composer. He has  scored Academy Award-winning movies such as A Separation and The Salesman. Oraki is a member of the Academy of Motion Picture Arts and Sciences.

Filmography 
 Killing a Traitor 2022
 Aghazadeh (TV series) 2020
 Privacy  2017
  Ghahreman-e akhar (Documentary) 2017
 The Elephant King   2017
 I Motherhood  2017
 Fasl-e Narges  2017 
 Vilaieha  2017
 Mermaid  2016
 The Salesman   2016
 Ferris wheel   2016
  A House on 41st Street   2016
  Se Mahi (TV Movie)   2015
  Dorane Asheghi 2015
  Panj Setareh 2014
 Toward Freedom 2014
 A House Beside Clouds 2014 
 Cherknevis (Video)  2014
 Az Iran, yek jodaee (Documentary)  2013
 Trapped (2013 film) 2013 
 Maybe There 2013
  Esterdad 2013
 Ekbatan 2012 
  Yek satr vagheiat 2012
  Shabake 2012
  Kooche melli 2011
  Nadarha 2011
  A Separation 2011
 Empty Paper Bag (Short)  2010
  Nasepas 2010
 Whatever God Wants 2010 
  The Strangers 2009
  Rismaneh baz 2008
  Sang, kaghaz, gheichi 2007

Composing for singers 
Salar Aghili For the Constitutional Days
Salar Aghili For the song of the mother 
Salar Aghili as  For the song endless way
Reza Yazdani For your wife song

Awards 
honorary diploma  (Celebration of critics and authors 2017)
Statue of the best music video   (Iranian Cinema Celebration 2013)
Simorgh Candidate for Fajr Film Festival 2016
Simorgh Candidate for Fajr Film Festival 2014
Simorgh Candidate for Fajr Film Festival 2013

References

External links

 

1969 births
Living people
Iranian composers